Jacobi Melius Alton Christiansen (February 2, 1900 – January 21, 1992) was an American football and basketball player and coach.  He served as the head football coach at Valparaiso University from 1929 to 1940 and at Concordia College in Moorhead, Minnesota from 1941 to 1968, compiling a career college football record of 175–92–15.  Christiansen's 1964 Concordia team tied with Sam Houston State in the NAIA National title game.  Christiansen is one of the few college football coaches to have coached in a stadium named after himself.

Playing career
Christiansen was born in Marinette, Wisconsin and grew up in Northfield, Minnesota where his father F. Melius Christiansen was conductor of the St. Olaf College Choir.  Christiansen had musical talent but was also a standout athlete in college.  He graduated from St. Olaf in 1924 with a bachelor's degree in physical education. He later earned a master's degree in education and counseling from North Dakota State University.

His younger brothers led major college choral programs in the twentieth century: Olaf C. Christiansen at St. Olaf College in Northfield, Minnesota, and Paul J. Christiansen at Concordia College in Moorhead, Minnesota.

Coaching career

Valparaiso
Christiansen was the head football coach for the Valparaiso University in Valparaiso, Indiana for 12 seasons, from 1929 until 1940.  His football coaching record at Valparaiso was 50–43–4.  His 1932 team completed the season undefeated.

Christiansen was called "A remarkable one-man athletics department" at Valparasio.  He served as football coach, basketball coach, and athletic director from 1929 through 1941.  His basketball team of 1938 won the Indiana Intercollegiate title and went on to play in the National Tournament in Kansas City, Missouri.  Valparaiso inducted him into their "Athletic Hall of Fame" in 1998.

Concordia (MN)
Christiansen moved to Concordia College in Moorhead, Minnesota to coach basketball from 1941–42 season through 1952–53 season.  He also coached football for the school from 1941 through 1968.

In fall 1964, Christiansen was named MIAC Coach of the Year, NAIA Coach of the Year and inducted into the NAIA Hall of Fame. That same year the construction of a new football stadium was announced. After its completion in 1966, it was dedicated as the Jake Christiansen Stadium.  He was inducted into the Concordia Athletic Hall of 
Fame in 1986.

Head coaching record

Football

References

External links
 

1900 births
1992 deaths
Concordia Cobbers football coaches
Concordia Cobbers men's basketball coaches
Valparaiso Beacons athletic directors
Valparaiso Beacons baseball coaches
Valparaiso Beacons football coaches
Valparaiso Beacons men's basketball coaches
St. Olaf Oles football players
North Dakota State University alumni
People from Marinette, Wisconsin
People from Northfield, Minnesota
American people of Norwegian descent
Basketball coaches from Minnesota